Bobolice  is a village in the administrative district of Gmina Niegowa, within Myszków County, Silesian Voivodeship, in southern Poland. It is known for Bobolice Castle.

References

Bobolice